Richard Thomas Osman (born 28 November 1970) is an English television presenter, producer, novelist and comedian. He is the creator and former co-presenter of the BBC One television quiz show Pointless. He has presented the BBC Two quiz shows Two Tribes and Richard Osman's House of Games and been a team captain on the comedy panel shows Insert Name Here and The Fake News Show. He has made appearances on many British panel shows.

Osman worked at Hat Trick Productions before becoming creative director of the television production company Endemol UK, producing shows including Prize Island for ITV and Deal or No Deal for Channel 4. He is the author of the crime novels The Thursday Murder Club (2020), The Man Who Died Twice (2021) and The Bullet That Missed (2022).

Early life
Richard Thomas Osman was born on 28 November 1970 in Billericay, Essex, to Brenda Wright and David Osman, and grew up in Cuckfield near Haywards Heath, West Sussex. When Richard Osman was nine years old, his father walked out on the family, which Osman says has created difficulty for the rest of his life. His mother went to teacher training college but, before she got a full-time job, making money to raise her two children was a challenge. His elder brother is musician Mat Osman, bass guitarist with the rock band Suede. 

Osman attended Warden Park School in Cuckfield. While still at school, he gained his first broadcasting experience, as a regular contributor to Turn It Up, an open-access music show which went out on Sunday evenings on BBC Radio Sussex (the show was also notable for giving early broadcast experience to BBC news journalist Jane Hill and radio DJ Jo Whiley). From 1989 to 1992, he studied Politics and Sociology at Trinity College, Cambridge, where he was a contemporary of Pointless co-presenter Alexander Armstrong, who read English.

Television career

Production
Osman began his career working as executive producer on British game shows, including Channel 4 comedy panel game 8 Out of 10 Cats and satirical comedy 10 O'Clock Live. He was the creative director at TV company Endemol UK, pitching the idea for Pointless to the BBC, becoming its co-presenter with his former university friend Alexander Armstrong, when it launched in 2009.

Osman created the short-lived 2013 ITV gameshow Prize Island. His other credits include Whose Line Is It Anyway?, Total Wipeout and the game show 24 Hour Quiz. As executive producer of 8 Out of 10 Cats does Deal or No Deal, it was Osman who revealed the identity of The Banker to be Deal or No Deal’s producer Glenn Hugill.

Osman acted as script editor for BBC One's Total Wipeout and in 1999, created and wrote the Channel 4 sitcom Boyz Unlimited with David Walliams and Matt Lucas. In 2005, he co-created and co-wrote the animated Channel 4 sitcom Bromwell High.

Osman left Endemol in 2020.

Presenting and Pointless
Since 2009, Osman has co-presented the BBC One teatime quiz show Pointless with host Alexander Armstrong. He created the show where he is jokingly known as Armstrong's "pointless friend". Having previously worked exclusively in behind-the-camera roles, Osman got the job as co-presenter/assistant when he pitched the idea for the show to a panel of BBC daytime heads, taking the role of the assistant in the demonstration.

Osman guest hosted Have I Got News for You in October 2013. In 2014, Osman began presenting a new BBC Two quiz show called Two Tribes. A second series began airing in February 2015. From October 2014, he guest-presented numerous episodes of The One Show. Beginning in 2016, he was a team captain on the BBC Two comedy panel show Insert Name Here, hosted by Sue Perkins. A second series was commissioned to begin airing in January 2017.

In February and December 2016, he presented Dragons' Den: Pitches to Riches, two special episodes which looked back over the past thirteen series of Dragons' Den on BBC Two. Since 2016, Osman has presented Child Genius on Channel 4. He appeared on the telethon Red Nose Day 2017 with The World Cup of Biscuits 2017. This involved polling with Twitter to find the best British biscuit. In April 2017 he appeared in the first episode of the third series of Murder in Successville.

In 2017, Osman began hosting his show Richard Osman's House of Games. Each weekday, four panelists compete in general knowledge tests in a variety of entertaining games. Six series of the show have been made. In 2020, Osman created a spin-off show titled House of Games Night, which aired on BBC One on Friday nights.

On 8 April 2022, Osman announced he would be leaving Pointless, after 1,300 episodes across 30 series. After his The Thursday Murder Club series received critical acclaim, he wished to spend more time as an author. He is, however, continuing to appear on the spin-off Pointless Celebrities. In a statement, he said, "Pointless has been a joy from start to finish, working alongside my friend Alexander Armstrong, backed by the most wonderful team, and for the best viewers in the world. I will miss everyone so much, but I'm thrilled I'll still be presenting the celebrity shows. I can't thank everyone enough for 12 amazing years." He will be replaced by a series of guest presenters throughout the year, with a permanent successor being chosen later in 2022. His co-host Armstrong said, "Daytime television's loss is international best-selling crime fiction's gain. I say that like it's a consolation - I'm going to miss the big man next to me Monday to Friday. But at least I still get him at weekends - and weekdays if you're watching on Challenge".

Comedy
Osman has made appearances on many panel shows, including Would I Lie to You?, Have I Got News for You, I'm Sorry I Haven't a Clue, The Unbelievable Truth, QI, and 8 Out of 10 Cats Does Countdown.

In 2016, he was a contestant on the second series of Taskmaster and appeared on the darts show Let's Play Darts.

Literary career
Viking Press, a subsidiary of Penguin Random House, acquired the rights to Osman's debut novel, The Thursday Murder Club, and one other novel, for a seven-figure sum in a 10-publisher auction in 2019. It was said that his first book would be published in autumn 2020, and the second the following year, as part of a crime series. His debut crime novel's release date was announced as 3 September 2020.

The Thursday Murder Club is set in a luxury retirement village in Kent where four residents gather to investigate crime cases, including a "live" murder mystery. Osman said that he was "in talks" for a TV adaptation of his novel. Osman later confirmed  that Steven Spielberg had acquired the book's film rights. The book has sold well over one million copies in the UK, and sold 45,000 UK hardback copies in the first three days after publication.

Osman's second crime novel, The Man Who Died Twice, was published in May 2022.

The third novel in the series, The Bullet That Missed, was published on 15 September 2022.

Osman has disclosed that his Murder Club series will contain four novels but readers will have to wait for the final book of the quartet while he completes his current thriller, due to be published in 2023.

Other work
Osman presented The Birthday Game podcast. Since 2021, he has featured in podcast adverts for premium ready-meal brand Charlie Bigham's.

On 9 June 2022, Osman was the subject of BBC's Who Do You Think You Are? He discovered that, through his maternal line, his four-times-great-grandfather Gabriel Gillham, a fisherman, had been involved in the discovery of a woman's remains and the subsequent 1831 murder trial of her husband Jon Holloway, in the Assizes at Lewes.

Personal life
Osman was born with nystagmus, an eye condition that significantly reduces his vision. He learns his scripts by heart as his condition makes it difficult to read an autocue.

Osman has two children, aged 23 and 21 , from a former relationship. On 3 December 2022 he married British actress Ingrid Oliver. He lives in Chiswick, West London. He is a season ticket holder at Fulham F.C..

On 6 December 2011, Osman became an "unlikely heartthrob" after winning Heats "Weirdest Crush Award".

In December 2021, Osman was the guest for BBC Radio 4's Desert Island Discs. His choices included "American Boy" by Estelle with Kanye West and "A Little Respect" by Erasure, with his favourite "You Can't Stop the Beat" by the cast of Hairspray. He revealed that he has had a food addiction since childhood and said that he had therapy for the disorder, but believed that it would be lifelong.

Television work

Production credits

Presenting roles

Non-presenting appearances

Bibliography

References

External links

1970 births
Living people
21st-century English novelists
Alumni of Trinity College, Cambridge
BBC television presenters
Endemol
English crime fiction writers
English comedians
English mystery writers
English game show hosts
English television producers
People educated at Warden Park School
People from Billericay